The 2004 Grand Prix of Sonoma was the fourth race for the 2004 American Le Mans Series season held at Infineon Raceway.  It took place on July 18, 2004.

This race saw Corvette Racing enter a third Corvette C5-R for Dale Earnhardt Jr. and co-driven by Boris Said.  The car was successfully qualified but in warm-up the morning of the race, Earnhardt Jr. went off course and collided with a barrier, causing a rupture of a fuel line.  The broken fuel line was sparked when the car came to a stop and caused the car to be engulfed in flames, with Earnhardt Jr. inside dazed by the accident and unable to get himself out immediately.  Once Earnhardt Jr. was able to become aware of his situation and rescue crews were able to arrive, Earnhardt Jr. was successfully pulled from the burning vehicle.  He received second and third degree burns to his neck, chest, and legs, partially due to not wearing a fire-retardant balaclava with his helmet.

The Corvette C5-R was burned beyond repair and did not race.  The Corvette Racing team quickly examined the car and found that there was no design flaw in their fuel system.  At the end of the 2004 ALMS season, Corvette Racing restored the car (Chassis No. C5-009) to its 2003 Le Mans specification and sold it to a collector.

Earnhardt Jr. was forced to return to the Nextel Cup Series unable to complete full races as he underwent treatment, being relieved the next two races by Martin Truex Jr. and John Andretti.

Official results

Class winners in bold.  Cars failing to complete 70% of winner's distance marked as Not Classified (NC).

Statistics
 Pole Position - #38 ADT Champion Racing - 1:22.320
 Fastest Lap - #38 ADT Champion Racing - 1:23.656
 Distance - 
 Average Speed -

External links
 

S
Grand Prix of Sonoma